John Boyd (1796–1873) was an American settler and politician. He served as a Congressman for the Republic of Texas and as a member of the Texas State Senate.

Early life
John Boyd was born on August 7, 1796 in Nashville, Tennessee. His father was Abraham Boyd and his mother, Nancy Linn. His brother, Linn Boyd, went on to serve as the Speaker of the United States House of Representatives from 1851 to 1855.

Career
By 1835, Boyd settled in Sabine County, Texas with his wife and children. He then served in the Texas Revolution.

Boyd served as a member of the Congress of the Republic of Texas from 1836 to 1845. In 1845, he moved to  Limestone County, Texas, where he staked a claim near the Tehuacana Hills, northwest of Tehuacana.

From 1862 to 1863, Boyd served in the Texas Senate. By then, he had become a secessionist, in favor of the Confederate States of America.

Boyd was also a landowner in Nashville. He donated 1,100 acres of land as well as financial assistance for the establishment of Trinity University.

Personal life, death and legacy
Boyd married Elizabeth McLean. They had nine children, but only three reached adulthood. He was a member of the Cumberland Presbyterian Church.

Boyd died on May 4, 1873. After his death, the land he owned in Nashville, Tennessee was inherited by his granddaughter, Rachel Douglas Boyd Smiley, the wife of Senator Henry S. Foote. They built a house, Old Central, which was later acquired by Vanderbilt University, on whose campus it still stands today.

References

Republic of Texas politicians
1st Congress of the Republic of Texas
1796 births
1873 deaths
Politicians from Nashville, Tennessee
People from Sabine County, Texas
American Presbyterians
Philanthropists from Texas
People from Limestone County, Texas
19th-century American philanthropists